The Colliergate drill hall is a former military installation at the corner of Colliergate and St Andrewgate in York.

History
The building was designed as a house and then converted to an inn in the mid-18th century. It was altered for military use with the addition of a drill hall designed by Gould and Fisher as the headquarters of the 1st West Yorkshire (York) Rifle Volunteers in 1872. This unit evolved to become the 1st West Yorkshire (York) Rifle Volunteer Battalion, The Prince of Wales's Own Regiment of Yorkshire in 1881 and the 5th Battalion The Prince of Wales's Own Regiment of Yorkshire in 1908. The battalion was mobilised at the drill hall in August 1914 before being deployed to the Western Front. Elements of the 5th Battalion, The West Yorkshire Regiment continued to use the drill hall until the battalion amalgamated with the 4th Battalion the East Yorkshire Regiment to form the 3rd Battalion the Prince of Wales's Own Regiment of Yorkshire in 1960. After the new battalion was established at Lumley Barracks in York, the Colliergate drill hall was decommissioned and has since been converted for use as a hardware store.

References

Drill halls in England
Grade II listed buildings in York